Coptotermes gaurii, is a species of subterranean termite of the genus Coptotermes. It is native to South India and Sri Lanka. It is a serious pest of tea in Sri Lanka.

References

External links
Current Status of Coptotermes Wasmann
Termite Assemblages in Lower Hanthana Forest and Variation in Worker Mandible Structure with Food Type
Revisiting Coptotermes (Isoptera: Rhinotermitidae): A global taxonomic road map for species validity and distribution of an economically important subterranean termite genus
Systematics of Oriental termites. II. A new species, Coptotermes gaurii, from Ceylon

Termites
Insects described in 1955
Insects of Sri Lanka